The 2022–23 Queens Royals men's basketball team represented the Queens University of Charlotte in the 2022–23 NCAA Division I men's basketball season. The Lions, led by first-year head coach Grant Leonard, played their home games at Curry Arena in Charlotte, North Carolina, as first-year members of the ASUN Conference. They finished the season 18–15, 7–11 in ASUN play to finish in a tie for ninth place. As the No. 9 seed in the ASUN tournament, they defeated Florida Gulf Coast before losing to Kennesaw State in the quarterfinals.

This season marked Queens' first year of a four-year transition period from Division II to Division I. As a result, the Royals were not eligible for NCAA postseason play until the 2026–27 season.

Previous season 
The Royals finished the 2021–22 NCAA Division II season 30–4, 21–3 in South Atlantic Conference play to finish as SAC regular season co-champions. They defeated Catawba, Newberry and Carson–Newman to win the SAC tournament. They qualified for the DII NCAA tournament, where they defeated Columbus State and conference co-champion Lincoln Memorial before losing to eventual national runner-up Augusta in the Southeast Regional final.

On May 6, 2022, the school announced it would move to Division I as a member of the ASUN Conference.

Roster

Schedule and results

|-
!colspan=9 style=| Non-conference regular season

|-
!colspan=9 style=| ASUN Conference regular season

|-
!colspan=12 style=| ASUN tournament

|-

Source

References

Queens Royals men's basketball seasons
Queens Royals
Queens Royals men's basketball
Queens Royals men's basketball